The 2007–08 Vyshcha Liha season is the seventeenth since its establishment. This season competition was sponsored by Biola which became the title sponsor of the League for the season. It began on 17 July 2007, and ended on 18 May 2008. 16 teams participated in the competition, 14 of which contested in the 2006-07 season, and two of which (Zakarpattia Uzhhorod and Naftovyk-Ukrnafta Okhtyrka) were promoted from the Ukrainian First League (the league immediately below the Ukrainian Premier League).

The winner of league was Shakhtar Donetsk with 74 points, followed by Dynamo Kyiv with 71 points. The top goalscorer of the season was Marko Dević from Metalist Kharkiv with 19 goals, 6 of which were penalties. The spot for second highest goalscorer with 17 goals was a three-way tie between Oleksandr Hladky from Shakhtar Donetsk, Yevhen Seleznyov from Arsenal Kyiv (on loan from Shakhtar), and Oleksandr Kosyrin from Metalurh Donetsk.

Teams

Promoted 
 FC Naftovyk-Ukrnafta Okhtyrka, champion of the 2006-07 Ukrainian First League – (returning after absence of 15 seasons)
 FC Zakarpattya Uzhhorod, runner-up of the 2006-07 Ukrainian First League – (returning after absence of a seasons)

Location map

Managers

Managerial changes

League table

Results

Top goalscorers

Stadia 
The following stadiums were used as home grounds during the season:

See also 
 2007–08 Ukrainian Cup
 2007–08 Ukrainian First League
 2007–08 Ukrainian Second League

References

External links 
 UEFA Website - Ukraine Premier Division
 Soccerway Website - Ukraine Premier League
 The Official Ukrainian PFL website 

Ukrainian Premier League seasons
1